Unedogemmula nuttalli is an extinct species of sea snail, a marine gastropod mollusk in the family Turridae, the turrids.

Description

Distribution
This extinct marine species was found in Miocene strata in Brunei.

References

External links
 M., Raven H., Landau B.M., Kocsis L., Adnan A., Zuschin M., Mandic O. & Briguglio A. (2018). Late Miocene gastropods from northern Borneo (Brunei Darussalam, Seria Formation). Palaeontographica, Abt. A: Palaeozoology – Stratigraphy. 313(1-3): 1-79.

nuttalli
Gastropods described in 2018